The secretary of state for work and pensions, also referred to as the work and pensions secretary, is a secretary of state in the Government of the United Kingdom, with overall responsibility for the business of the Department for Work and Pensions. The incumbent is a member of the Cabinet of the United Kingdom.

The office holder works alongside the other Work and Pensions ministers. The corresponding shadow minister is the shadow secretary of state for work and pensions and the shadow secretary of state for the future of work. The performance of the secretary of state is also scrutinised by the Work and Pensions Select Committee.

The office is currently held by Mel Stride.

Responsibilities
Corresponding to what is generally known as a labour minister in many other countries, the work and pensions secretary's remit includes:

 Support people of working age
 Oversight of employers and pensions
 Fiscal Consolidation
 Providing support for disability
 Support for families and children

History
It was created on 8 June 2001 by the merger of the Employment division of the Department for Education and Employment and the Department of Social Security.

The Ministry of Pensions was created in 1916 to handle the payment of war pensions to former members of the Armed Forces and their dependants. In 1944 a separate Ministry of National Insurance (titled the Ministry of Social Insurance until 17 November 1944) was formed; the two merged in 1953 as the Ministry of Pensions and National Insurance. In 1966 the Ministry was renamed the Ministry of Social Security, but this was short-lived, as the Ministry merged with the Ministry of Health in 1968 to form the Department of Health and Social Security. Confusingly, the Secretary of State responsible for this Department was titled the Secretary of State for Social Services. The Department was de-merged in 1988, creating the separate Department of Health and Department of Social Security.

List of Ministers and Secretaries of state
Colour key (for political parties): /  /  /  / 

* Incumbent's length of term last updated: .

See also
Secretary of State for Employment
Parliamentary Under-Secretary of State for Pensions and Financial Inclusion

References

Work and Pensions, Secretary of State
Ministerial offices in the United Kingdom
Secretaries of State for Work and Pensions